Brighton was an electoral district of the House of Assembly in the Australian state of South Australia from 1970 to 1985. Brighton was replaced by the seat of Bright at the 1985 election.

Members

References 

S.A. Former Members

Former electoral districts of South Australia
1970 establishments in Australia
1985 disestablishments in Australia
Constituencies established in 1970
Constituencies disestablished in 1985